Retiviy is a  of the Russian Navy. The ship's name was reported to have changed to Mercury in 2021.

Development and design 

The Steregushchiy-class corvettes have a steel hull and composite material superstructure, with a bulbous bow and nine watertight subdivisions. They have a combined bridge and command centre, and space and weight provision for eight SS-N-25 missiles. Newest physical field reduction solutions were applied too. As a result, designers considerably reduced the ship's radar signature thanks to hull architecture and fire-resistant radar-absorbent fiberglass applied in tophamper's design. Stealth technology was widely used during construction of the ships, as well as 21 patents and 14 new computer programs.

The Kashtan CIWS on the first ship was replaced in subsequent vessels by 12 Redut VLS cells containing 9M96E medium-range SAMs of the S-350 system. SS-N-27 (Kalibr type missiles) will be fitted to a larger domestic version, Project 20385.

The export version known as Project 20382 Tigr carries either eight supersonic SS-N-26 (P-800 Oniks) anti-ship missiles or sixteen subsonic SS-N-25 'Switchblade' (Kh-35E Uran). It also carries two twin-tube launchers for 533mm heavy torpedoes. The A-190E 100mm gun first used in the s is controlled by a 5P-10E system that can track four targets simultaneously. Protection from air attacks is provided by the Kashtan CIWS and eight mounts for the SA-N-10 'Grouse' (9K38 Igla) SAM.

Construction and career 
Retiviy was laid down on 20 February 2015, and launched on 12 March 2020 by Severnaya Verf in Saint Petersburg. In April 2020, the ship's crew was formed. The crew arrived in St. Petersburg at the beginning of May 2020 for training. The ship was originally planned to go for sea trials at the end of 2020. However, mooring trials were first initiated in October 2021. While the transfer to the Black Sea Fleet was scheduled for the end of 2021, as of January 2022 the vessel remained on trials.

The name of the ship was changed to Mercury in 2021. The ship was reported to have started sea trials in May 2022 and was reported as planned for commissioning in October. In October it was reported that commissioning may have been postponed into 2023.

References 

2020 ships
Ships built at Severnaya Verf
Steregushchiy-class corvettes